Cobb Island is a small island located at the confluence of the Potomac and Wicomico rivers in southern Charles County, Maryland, United States. Cobb Island is separated from the mainland by Neale Sound and connected to it by a  fixed bridge carrying Maryland Route 254.

Cobb Island is an unincorporated community and census-designated place (CDP). As of the 2010 census, the CDP had a population of 1,166. The community has a small post office, a volunteer fire department and rescue squad, a Baptist church, a large community green space (Fisherman's Field) and a small playground for children. Commercially, there are two seafood restaurants with marinas (Captain John's Crab House, and Shymansky's Restaurant & Marina), The Rivah, a marina with a pizzeria restaurant chain (Ledo Pizza), a small bar and grill (The Scuttlebutt), a seasonal coffee shop, art gallery and bakery (The Cove at Cobb Island), and a small market (Cobb Island Market).

History

Name origin and privateer past
The Island was owned in 1642 by James Neal, a privateer (a legal pirate working for the British Empire) who captured Spanish ships bearing treasure to Spain from Central America. Captured Spanish coins were cut into "cobbs" (smaller coins) and distributed to Maryland colonists, which led to the name "Cobb Island".

World's first human voice radio transmission
Fessenden was using a spark transmitter with a Kintner-Brashear interrupter.

20th century and later
Robert Crain bought Cobb Island and organized the Cobb Island Development Company. In 1922 and 1923, the company constructed roads, a summer resort and a bridge to the island.

Demographics

References

External links

 Cobb Island Official FACEBOOK page

 Census information about Cobb Island, MD 20625

River islands of Maryland
Islands of the Potomac River
Census-designated places in Charles County, Maryland
Landforms of Charles County, Maryland